Penguang anak Manggil (born 4 August 1954) is a Malaysian politician from the Progressive Democratic Party (PDP), a component party of the ruling Gabungan Parti Sarawak (GPS) coalition. He has served as State Deputy Minister of Public Health and Housing of Sarawak in the GPS state administration under Chief Minister Abang Abdul Rahman Johari Abang Openg and Minister Sim Kui Hian since January 2022. He served as State Deputy Minister of Local Government of Sarawak in the Barisan Nasional (BN) and GPS state administrations under Chief Ministers Adenan Satem and Abang Johari and Minister Sim from May 2016 to December 2021 and Member of the Sarawak State Legislative Assembly (MLA) for Marudi since May 2016.

Education
Penguang obtained a Bachelor of Science (BSc) in Forestry (Hons.) from the College of Agriculture Malaya (UPM) in 1978. He then furthered his studies to the University of Edinburgh in Scotland and obtained a Master of Science (MSc) in Resource Management in 1989. Finally, he attended the Irish International University (IIU) between 1998 and 2001 and obtained a Doctorate (PhD) in sustainable forest management. The latter institution has been described as a "scam" by BBC.

Election results

Honours
  :
  Officer of the Order of the Defender of the Realm (KMN) (2008)
  :
  Commander of the Order of the Star of Hornbill Sarawak (PGBK) – Datuk (2022)
  Order of Meritorious Service to Sarawak (DJBS) – Datu (2012)

See also
 Marudi (state constituency)

References

Living people
1954 births
21st-century Malaysian politicians
Members of the Sarawak State Legislative Assembly
Commanders of the Order of the Star of Hornbill Sarawak
Officers of the Order of the Defender of the Realm
People from Sarawak
Iban people
Alumni of the University of Edinburgh
University of Putra Malaysia alumni